The George and Temperance Adams House is a historic house located in Orem, Utah, United States.

Description
Built in 1895 and expanded in 1903, the Late Victorian-style house is architecturally significant as an example of economic prosperity enabling better building methods. The house is built with brick upon adobe and has more detail than previous common types of homes. Also, the property includes a granary/creamery that "is one of only
a few agricultural outbuildings remaining from the early settlement period of Orem."

Originally the property had , but is now a  plot of land.

It was listed on the National Register of Historic Places on December 30, 1999.

See also

 National Register of Historic Places listings in Utah County, Utah

References

External links

 National Register of Historic Places

Houses completed in 1895
Houses on the National Register of Historic Places in Utah
Houses in Orem, Utah
Victorian architecture in Utah
National Register of Historic Places in Orem, Utah